Elections to the 187th Massachusetts State Senate was held on November 4, 2008, the same date as the 2008 Massachusetts House election as well as Federal and Congressional elections. Massachusetts Senators serve two-year terms.

Senate contests in 2008

See also
 2009–2010 Massachusetts legislature
 List of Massachusetts General Courts

References

External links
 
Imagine Election — Sample ballots, candidate profiles and polling place information for Massachusetts voters.
Project Vote Smart — Candidate information including issue positions and voting records.

State Senate
Senate 2008
Massachusetts Senate
Massachusetts Senate